Penelope Ann Fuller is an American actress. She received two Tony Award nominations for her performances on Broadway stage: for Applause (1970), and The Dinner Party (2001). For her television performances, Fuller received six Emmy Award nominations, winning once, in 1982 for playing Madge Kendal in The Elephant Man.

Early life and family
Fuller was born in Durham, North Carolina. She attended Lumberton High School and Northwestern University, where her teachers included Alvina Krause.

Career
Fuller moved to New York City and made her Broadway debut in The Moon Besieged (1962); she appeared as a replacement in the original productions of Barefoot in the Park (1963) and Cabaret (1966).

After a handful of Shakespearean productions, Fuller gained notice on Broadway for her portrayal of the outwardly sweet but subtly undermining Eve Harrington in Applause (1970–1972), the musical version of All About Eve with Lauren Bacall as Margo Channing. She started in Richard Rodgers' 1976 flop about Henry VIII, Rex, in which she appeared opposite Nicol Williamson and Glenn Close. Fuller continued to work in musicals, including the original production of William Finn's A New Brain and a 1999 revival of Rodgers' Do I Hear a Waltz? at New Jersey's George Street Playhouse. In later years, Fuller was also on Broadway in the original productions of Wendy Wasserstein's An American Daughter (1997) and Neil Simon's The Dinner Party (2000); she was Tony-nominated for the latter. Off-Broadway appearances have included Three Viewings (1995) and Nicky Silver's Beautiful Child. Most recently, appeared in the 2017 revival of Sunday in the Park with George and as the Dowager Empress in Anastasia.

Fuller has extensive television work to her credit, including an Emmy-winning performance as Mrs. Kendal in the TV version of Bernard Pomerance's play The Elephant Man (1982) and Cat on a Hot Tin Roof (1984) by Tennessee Williams, in which she played Mae (a.k.a. Sister Woman). In 1992 she played Nancy McKeon's mother Ruth Benson in the CBS movie Baby Snatcher.

Fuller portrayed Amanda Harding in the ABC crime drama Fortune Dane (1986). She also appeared in dozens of other TV series, including The Edge of Night (1964), Love, American Style (1969), The Bob Newhart Show (1972), The F.B.I. (1972), Banacek (1973), The Six Million Dollar Man (1974), Barnaby Jones (1975), Family (1977), Barnaby Jones (1975), Trapper John, M.D. (1979 and 1981), One Day at a Time (1983), The Love Boat (1983 and 1985), Matlock (1988), L.A. Law (1988), Murder, She Wrote (1988 and 1993), China Beach (1989–90), Columbo (1990), Quantum Leap (1992), NYPD Blue (1994), Mad About You (1994–95), Melrose Place (1994–95), ER (1995), Law & Order (1998) and Judging Amy (2002 and 2005).

Her film work includes All the President's Men (1976) and The Beverly Hillbillies (1993).

Personal life
Fuller married Knox Kinlaw, an Atlanta doctor, in 1977, and had a daughter together that same year.

Filmography

 Women in Chains (1972, TV movie) as Helen Anderson
 Applause (1973, TV movie) as Eve Harrington
 All the President's Men (1976) as Sally Aiken
 Amber Waves (1980, TV movie) as Fern Jensen
 The Elephant Man (1982, TV movie) as Mrs. Kendal
 A Piano for Mrs. Cimino (1982, TV movie) as Mrs. Polanski
 Lois Gibbs and the Love Canal (1982, TV movie) as Jeannie Kolchak
 Intimate Agony (1983, TV movie) as Joanna
 Quantum Leap (1992, TV Series) as Jane Lindhurst, episode "The Play's the Thing"
 License to Kill (1984, TV movie) as Judith Peterson
 Cat on a Hot Tin Roof (1984, TV movie) as Mae
 As Summers Die (1986, TV movie) as Marci Holt
 George Washington II: The Forging of a Nation (1986, TV movie) as Eliza Powel
 The Two Mrs. Grenvilles (1987, TV mini-series) as Cordelia Grenville Hardington
 Fire and Rain (1989, TV movie) as Mrs. Hamilton
 Lies Before Kisses (1991, TV movie) as Katherine
 False Arrest (1991, TV movie) as Marilyn Redmond
 Miss Rose White (1992, TV movie) as Kate Ryan
 Baby Snatcher (1992, TV movie) as Ruth Benson
 Rio Shannon (1993, TV movie) as Beatrice Minister
 Star (1993, TV movie) as Olivia Wyatt
 The Beverly Hillbillies (1993) as Mrs. Margaret Drysdale
 Melrose Place (1993-94) as Marilyn Carter
 The Gift of Love(1994, TV movie) as Leora
 All My Children (1995–96) as Lois (Erika Kane's rehab roommate)
 Shadow Conspiracy (1997) as Dr. Olson
 The Color of Love: Jacey's Story (2000, TV movie) as Madeleine Porter
 King of the Corner (2004) as Mrs. Hargrove
 James McNeill Whistler and the Case for Beauty (2014) as Anna Whistler (voice)
 Strawberry Mansion (2021) as Arabella Isadora

References

External links
 
 
 
 
 

20th-century American actresses
21st-century American actresses
Actresses from Durham, North Carolina
Actresses from North Carolina
American film actresses
American stage actresses
American television actresses
Living people
Northwestern University School of Communication alumni
Outstanding Performance by a Supporting Actress in a Miniseries or Movie Primetime Emmy Award winners
People from Lumberton, North Carolina
Year of birth missing (living people)